The Lions Fire was a wildfire in the Ansel Adams Wilderness in Inyo National Forest and the Sierra National Forest in California in the United States. The fire was started by a lightning strike and first reported on June 11, 2018. The fire impacted recreational activities in both national forests, as well as access to Devils Postpile National Monument.

Events
The Lions Fire was reported around noon on June 11, 2018. Started by a lightning strike, it was spotted near Lion Point in the Ansel Adams Wilderness in the Sierra National Forest. On June 22, the fire crossed into Inyo National Forest. The Lions Fire has been burning in high elevations, approximately 6,000 to 8,000 in elevation, thriving on red fir.

A temporary flight restriction was put in place over a five-mile radius on June 25. By the next day, the fire had burned into the Stairway Creek, northwest of the middle fork of the San Joaquin River. It also reached the Butte Fire (2017) footprint, which slowed the Lions Fire's westward movement. As of June 30, the fire had slowed its progression and was seven percent contained and had burned .

July 1 marked the fourth day of burn-out operations on the Lions Fire. Air quality remained poor in Mammoth Lakes and the surrounding areas.

By late August, the growth of the Lions Fire slowed, with containment gradually increasing. On October 1, 2018, InciWeb declared the Lions Fire to be inactive, as no more hotspots were detected within the fire perimeter.

Impact

Health
Wind patterns caused the fire's smoke to impact the air quality of Mammoth Lakes and other areas east of the fire.

Recreation
The Lions fire impacted visitor access to the Ansel Adams Wilderness, during which trails, in both Inyo and Sierra National Forests, heading towards the fire zone were closed to hikers.

Environment
Due to the fire's location in a designated wilderness area, fire crews used Minimum Impact Suppression Tactics, such as air assistance and hand construction, to minimize their impact on the landscape, supporting a healthy ecosystem. This also provides for better firefighter safety and reduction of hazardous vegetation.

References

External links

 

Lions
June 2018 events in the United States
July 2018 events in the United States
Wildfires in Fresno County, California
Wildfires in Madera County, California
Wildfires in Mono County, California